The 2014 Qatar Total Open was a professional women's tennis tournament played on hard courts. It was the 12th edition of the event and part of the WTA Premier 5 series of the 2014 WTA Tour. It took place at the International Tennis and Squash complex in Doha, Qatar between 10 and 16 February 2014.

Points and prize money

Point distribution

Prize money

* per team

Singles main-draw entrants

Seeds

1 Rankings as of February 3, 2014.

Other entrants
The following players received wildcards into the singles main draw:
 Fatma Al-Nabhani
 Çağla Büyükakçay
 Alisa Kleybanova

The following players received entry from the qualifying draw:
 Petra Cetkovská
 Hsieh Su-wei
 Alla Kudryavtseva
 Mirjana Lučić-Baroni
 Petra Martić
 Nadia Petrova
 Tsvetana Pironkova
 Maryna Zanevska

The following player received entry as a lucky loser:
 Tadeja Majerič

Withdrawals
Before the tournament
 Victoria Azarenka (foot injury) → replaced by  Annika Beck
 Jamie Hampton → replaced by  Stefanie Vögele
 Bojana Jovanovski → replaced by  Kristina Mladenovic
 Madison Keys → replaced by  Yanina Wickmayer
 Svetlana Kuznetsova → replaced by  Shuai Zhang
 Sabine Lisicki (shoulder injury) → replaced by  Monica Niculescu
 Ekaterina Makarova → replaced by  Varvara Lepchenko
 Carla Suárez Navarro (elbow injury) → replaced by  Tadeja Majerič
 Serena Williams (back injury) → replaced by  Karolína Plíšková

Retirements
 Dominika Cibulková (gastrointestinal illness)
 Daniela Hantuchová (right knee injury)
 Mirjana Lučić-Baroni (low back injury)

Doubles main-draw entrants

Seeds

1 Rankings as of February 3, 2014.

Other entrants
The following pairs received wildcards into the doubles main draw:
  Fatma Al-Nabhani  /  Michaela Hončová
  Yuliya Beygelzimer  /  Olga Savchuk
  Kirsten Flipkens  /  Francesca Schiavone
  Jelena Janković  /  Alisa Kleybanova

Withdrawals
During the tournament
 Mirjana Lučić-Baroni (low back injury)

Champions

Singles

  Simona Halep def.  Angelique Kerber, 6–2, 6–3

Doubles

  Hsieh Su-wei /  Peng Shuai def.  Květa Peschke /  Katarina Srebotnik, 6–4, 6–0

External links
Official Website

Qatar Total Open
Qatar Total Open
Qatar Total Open
Qatar Ladies Open